As with most ancient Egyptian royal dynasties, the family tree for the Twelfth Dynasty is complex and unclear.

References 

 Grajetzki, Wolfram (2005) Ancient Egyptian Queens – a hieroglyphic dictionary

Family tree
12